The Universidad José Cecilio del Valle UJCV is the pioneer of the private higher education institutions in Honduras. Founded in 1978 by the initiative of the Asociación Hondureña para el Fomento de la Educación Superior AHFES. It offers careers of associate degrees as well as 4 to 5 year bachelor's degrees in different areas of the human knowledge.

Mission
To form innovative professionals capable of submitting themselves in a continuous learning process.

Careers
The Universidad José Cecilio del Valle actually offers 19 careers at a BS level, and associate level.

Bachelor degrees
Law,
Interior Design,
Journalism,
Civil Engineering,
Architecture,
Construction Engineering,
Industrial Engineering,  
Agriculture Engineering,
Computer Systems Engineering,
Industrial Business Administration,
Tourism Business Administration,
Agriculture Business Administration.

Associate degrees
Construction Technician, Graphical Design Technician, Interior Design Technician, Journalism Technician, Electronic Data Processing Technician, Business Administration Technician, Tourism Technician.

External links
Official website

Universities in Honduras
Educational institutions established in 1978
Forestry education
1978 establishments in North America